Sheldon Kennedy  (born June 15, 1969) is a Canadian former professional ice hockey player. He played for the Detroit Red Wings, Boston Bruins and Calgary Flames in the National Hockey League (NHL). Kennedy was drafted by the Red Wings in the fourth round of the 1988 NHL Entry Draft while playing with the Swift Current Broncos of the Western Hockey League (WHL). In the WHL, Kennedy helped the Broncos capture the 1989 Memorial Cup, and was named to the tournament all-star team. Kennedy represented Canada internationally at the World Junior Championships in 1988 and 1989. He helped Canada win a gold medal at the 1988 tournament. Kennedy was born in Brandon, Manitoba, but grew up in Elkhorn, Manitoba.

Kennedy is known for going public as a victim of sexual abuse by his coach, Graham James. In 1998, Kennedy roller bladed across Canada to raise awareness and funds for sexual abuse victims. Currently, Kennedy serves as a spokesperson for violence and abuse prevention programs with the Canadian Red Cross. He was honoured by Hockey Canada in 2020, with the Order of Hockey in Canada.

Playing career

Junior
Kennedy started playing junior hockey with the Winnipeg South Blues of the Manitoba Junior Hockey League (MJHL) in 1985. After being noticed by Graham James at a hockey camp, Kennedy joined the Swift Current Broncos of the Western Hockey League (WHL) for the 1986–87 season.  He spent the rest of his WHL career with the Broncos, helping the team capture the 1989 Memorial Cup. For his play during the tournament, Kennedy was named to the Memorial Cup All-Star Team. He was also named to the WHL's Eastern Conference Second All-Star Team. Kennedy along with fellow future NHLer Joe Sakic, was a passenger in the Swift Current Broncos bus crash that occurred in December 1986, killing four members of the team.

Professional
Kennedy was selected by the Detroit Red Wings in the fourth round (80th overall) of the 1988 National Hockey League (NHL) Entry Draft.  His first professional season was split between the Red Wings in the NHL and their minor league affiliate Adirondack Red Wings of the American Hockey League (AHL). At the NHL level, Kennedy scored two goals and added seven assists in 20 games.  Kennedy spent the next four seasons bouncing between the AHL and NHL within the Red Wings organization. The Winnipeg Jets acquired Kennedy from the Red Wings after the 1993–94 season.  The NHL lock-out meant that Kennedy did not play for the Jets before being picked up on waivers by the Calgary Flames.  Kennedy spent two seasons in Calgary, then the Flames decided not to renew his contract in 1996, shortly after his sexual abuse revelation.  He signed as a free agent with the Boston Bruins for the 1996–97 season but also spent time with the Providence Bruins, Boston's AHL affiliate.  The 1996–97 season was Kennedy's last campaign in the NHL but he later resurfaced in the 1998–99 season with the Manitoba Moose of the now-defunct International Hockey League.  Kennedy also played for EV Landshut of the Deutsche Eishockey Liga in Germany during the 1998–99 season.

Child advocacy 
Kennedy has devoted his post hockey career to child abuse prevention and education. Along with his business partner, Wayne McNeil, he owns and operates Respect Group Inc. which provides training to thousands of people with messages and tools of empowerment to help people involved in amateur sport and education systems prevent bullying, harassment, and abuse.

On June 15, 2012 Kennedy was awarded an Honorary Doctorate from the University of Fraser Valley for his work supporting victims of child abuse and promoting education and awareness of the topic. On June 8, 2015 Kennedy was awarded with an Honorary degree, Doctor of Laws, from the University of Calgary for his extraordinary commitment to violence and abuse prevention programs in Canada.

On April 13, 2013 the Calgary Child Advocacy Centre was renamed the Sheldon Kennedy Child Advocacy Centre at an ceremony hosted by Prime Minister Stephen Harper. The centre provides services to children and their families using a coordinated, multi-disciplinary approach. The Centre houses 95 professionals from Calgary Police Services, Alberta Health Services, Child and Family Services, Royal Canadian Mounted Police, Alberta Education and crown prosecutors who work together to assess, treat, and seek justice for physically and sexually abused children. Sheldon Kennedy serves as a board member.

Kennedy was named as a Member of the Order of Canada on December 26, 2014  for “his courageous leadership in raising awareness of childhood sexual abuse and his continued efforts to prevent abuse in schools, sports and communities.”

Kennedy received the Lincoln Alexander Outstanding Leader Award at the University of Guelph, March 25, 2015.

In 2016 Kennedy was appointed to the Alberta Order of Excellence.

Kennedy was inducted into the Manitoba Sports Hall of Fame as an athlete/builder in 2020.

Personal life

A television movie about his life, The Sheldon Kennedy Story, aired on CTV in 1999. Jonathan Scarfe starred as Kennedy. In 2006, he released his autobiography, Why I Didn't Say Anything - The Sheldon Kennedy Story. In the book he revealed that nightmares of James still continue to plague him. He also wrote frankly about his battles with cocaine addiction.  The feature-length documentary Swift Current, released in 2016, details Kennedy's life from abuse to advocacy.

Awards and achievements

Career statistics

Regular season and playoffs

International

References

External links 

Kennedy's publishing profile 

1969 births
Adirondack Red Wings players
Boston Bruins players
Calgary Flames players
Canadian ice hockey right wingers
Detroit Red Wings draft picks
Detroit Red Wings players
Ice hockey people from Manitoba
Living people
Manitoba Moose (IHL) players
Members of the Alberta Order of Excellence
Members of the Order of Canada
Members of the Order of Manitoba
Moose Jaw Warriors players
Order of Hockey in Canada recipients
Sportspeople from Brandon, Manitoba
Swift Current Broncos players
Winnipeg South Blues players